Pascale Got (born April 1, 1961 in Royan, Charente-Maritime) was a member of the National Assembly of France.  She represented Gironde's 5th constituency from 2007 to 2017, as a member of the Socialist Party and the Socialiste, radical, citoyen et divers gauche parliamentary group.

References

1961 births
Living people
People from Royan
Socialist Party (France) politicians
Women members of the National Assembly (France)
Deputies of the 13th National Assembly of the French Fifth Republic
Deputies of the 14th National Assembly of the French Fifth Republic
21st-century French women politicians